Sanem Çelik (born 18 May 1975) is a Turkish actress, artist and dancer.

Filmography

Film 

 1996: Wild, Emine, TRT
 2001: Elephants and Grass, Havva Adem, Pan Film
 2003: Children Of Secret, "Guest Actress", Tivoli Film
 2005: The Dark Face Of The Moon, Meryem, Sinevizyon
 2013: Behzat C: Ankara is Burning, Ulrike, Adam Film
 2014: Fish, Filiz Osmanoğlu, Marathon Film

TV series 

 1997–1999: Black Angel, Yasemin Saylan, Eylül Productions, Star TV
 2000: Bad Luck, Banu Bilge, Eylül Productions, Star TV
 2002: My Dear Husband, Banu Berke, TRT 1
 2003: What Was My Sin, Semiha, Delta Film, TRT 1
 2004–2006: Aliye, Aliye Adıvar (Karahan), TMC, ATV
 2008–2009: Güldünya, Gizem Ozsoy, TMC, ATV
 2013 : Living Deliberately, Zeynep, Surec FIlm, Kanal D
 2013 : İnadına Yaşamak, Zeynep
 2014 : Çocuklar Duymasın, Ayten (Guest appearance)
 2016–2018-2021: Eşkıya Dünyaya Hükümdar Olmaz, Ceylan Özsoy
 2018 : Bir Litre Gözyașı, Figen

Documentary 

 2003: Hittites, Queen Puduhepa, Ekip Film

Voice-over 

 1999: Stuart Little, Mrs. Camille Stout, (Turkish)
 2000: Chicken Run, Ginger, (Turkish)
 2003: Red's Diary by Görkem Yeltan
 2004: White The Lazy Worm by Görkem Yeltan
 2006: Treasure Garden by Görkem Yeltan

Music 

 2001: "Album" by Toprak Sergen

Theatre 

 1999: Piano Sounds From Distance, Fiokla, Istanbul University State Conservatory
 2000: Run For Your Wife, Mary Smith, by Ray Cooney, Dormen Theatre
 2004: Run For Your Wife, Mary Smith, by Ray Cooney, Tiyatrokare

Musical 

 1985: Puppeteer, Children Musical by Muharrem Buhara, The Istanbul City Theatre
 1998: Hommage To Çiğdem Talu, Musical, pianist Melih Kibar, Istanbul University State Conservatory

Ballet 

 1986: From Dream to Reality (J.Massenet)
 1987: Swan Lake - Sleeping Beauty (P.İ.Tchaikovsky), Raymonda (A.Glazunov), For The Memory of an old Photograph (T.Khrennikov), 3.World Dance Day, Respect for Noverre (Bellini)
 1988: Giselle (A.Adam), La Sylphide (H.Lovenskiold), North Winds (Sviridov), White Night (A.Luigini), Graduation Ball (J.Strauss)
 1989: La Bayadere (L.Minkus)
 1990: Adagio (Albinoni), Equinox (M.Theodorakis), Piaf Suit (E. Piaf), from 30's to 90's (Various Tangos), Dance of the Hours, Ballet Flute Piano (F.Chopin-A.Dvořák), Walpurgis Night/Faust (C.Gounod)
 1991: Pas De Six (C.Pugni), Afternoon of a Faun (C.A.Debussy), Brankhos (Carreras-Domingo-Pavarotti), Towards Peace (Mahler), Caridas (Yanni)
 1992: Romeo and Juliet Pas De Deux (Prokofiev), Le Corsaire Pas De Deux (Adolphe Adam), Ward, (Stravinsky), King's Cemetery B.C. (Hadjidakis), Slaves Chorus from Nabucco (Verdi)
 1993: Requiem (A.L.Webber), Black Swan Solo (P.I.Tchaikovsky)
 1994: Pas de Quatre (C.Pugni), Byzantine Pas De Deux (Anonym), Tchaikovsky in the Dream, (P.İ.Tchaikovsky)
 2007: Danova Ballet School Assisting - Teaching
 2012: "İstanbul" (Shaman Dance Theatre)

Pantomime 

 1988: "Vecihi Ofluoğlu and His Pupils"
 1989: "Pink Panter with Orkestra", by Vecihi Ofluoğlu
 1992: "25th Anniversary of Vecihi Ofluoğlu"

Modeling 

 1996: "Asena Exclusive" - "Alkış Butique" by Yaşar Saraçoğlu

Sports 

 2005: "Volkswagen Polo Ladies Cup Car Race", Doğuş Motorsports

Awards 
 1996: 10th International Adana Golden Boll Film Festival Awards "Best Supporting Actress"  Wild
 1998: Entertainment Journalists' Guild Golden Objective Awards "Best Actress in a TV Series" Black Angel
 2000: Lions Club International
 2000: 37th Antalya Golden Orange Film Festival Awards "Best Actress" Elephants and Grass
 2000: 8th Contemporary Screen Actors Guild, ÇASOD "Best Actress" Elephants and Grass
 2001: 20th Istanbul International Golden Tulip Film Festival Awards "Best Actress" Elephants and Grass
 2001: 8th Avşa Film Festival Awards "Best Actress" Elephants and Grass
 2001: 12th Orhon Murat Arıburnu Awards "Best Actress" Elephants and Grass
 2001: 23rd Screen Writers Guild Awards "Best Actress" Elephants and Grass
 2004: Afife Theatre Awards "Nominated as a Supporting Actress in a Comedy" Run For Your Wife
 2004: 32nd Golden Butterfly Television Stars Awards "Best Actress" Aliye
 2005: Volkswagen Polo Ladies Cup, 3rd Place in the 1st Race, 5th Place in the general classification
 2005: Beykent University Media Awards "Best Actress" Aliye
 2005: 28th Radio Television Journalists' Association TV Oscars "Television Star" Aliye
 2005: 1st White Pearl TV Awards "Best Actress in a TV Series" Aliye
 2005: TDB Turkish Dental Association Special Award

Jury 

 2002: 13th Orhon Murat Arıburnu Film Festival
 2013: 3rd International Crime and Punishment Film Festival

References

External links 
 
 

1975 births
Actresses from Istanbul
Living people
Turkish film actresses
Best Actress Golden Orange Award winners
Turkish stage actresses
Best Supporting Actress Golden Boll Award winners
Turkish ballerinas
Turkish people of Circassian descent
20th-century Turkish actresses
Istanbul University alumni
Golden Butterfly Award winners